The Protestant Separate School Board of the Town of Penetanguishene (PSSBP) is a separate English-language school board headquartered in Penetanguishene, Ontario, Canada.  The board consists of a single school, the Burkevale Protestant Separate School. It is the only non-Catholic separate school in Ontario.

See also
List of school districts in Ontario
List of high schools in Ontario

External links
 School Board information
 The Protestant Separate School Board of the Town of Penetanguishene

School districts in Ontario